Nicholas V, Duke of Krnov (also known as Nicholas II of Opava-Ratibor; ; 1409–1452) was a member of the Přemyslid dynasty. He was Duke of Racibórz, Krnov, Bruntál and Rybnik. All these duchies were situated in Silesia, then part of the Crown of Bohemia.

Life 
Nicholas was older son of John "the Iron" and Helena of Lithuania (niece of King Wladyslaw II Jagiello of Poland). He was born in 1409.

Nicholas and his younger brother Wenceslaus II were minors when their father died in 1424, their mother, Helena of Lithuania acted as regent until 1428.  Until 1449, she styled herself as Lady of Pszczyna, suggesting that she had received Pless as her jointure.  Nicholas V and Wenceslaus II ruled their duchy jointly until October 15, 1437, at which time they divided their inheritance. Nicholas V received Krnov, Bruntál, Rybnik, Wodzisław Śląski, and Baborów, while Wenceslaus II received Racibórz, Żytna, and Pilchowice. Nicholas had to inherited Pszczyna after his mother death.

In 1433, a Hussite army passing through the Váh valley devastated Racibórz and prepared to hand it to Duke Bolko V of Opole, who supported the Hussites.  However, Nicholas V reconquered Racibórz.  In 1436, Nicholas V also conquered the Duchy of Głubczyce, which was owned by Duke Wenceslaus II of Opava, who retaliated by conquering Żory.  In 1437, Nicholas V and Wenceslaus II of Opava reached a compromise.

In 1443, Nicholas allied himself with Dukes William of Opava, Przemyslaus II of Cieszyn, and Henry IX of Żagań-Głogów against the robber barons who infested Silesia.

Nicholas V died in 1452. Initially, his sons John IV and Wenceslaus III ruled jointly. However, in 1464, they divided their inheritance, with John IV taking Krnov and Wodzisław Śląski and Wenceslaus III taking Rybnik, Pless and Żory.

Marriage and issue 
In 1435, Nicholas V married Margaret Clemm of Ellguth. They had three children:
 John IV "the Elder" (d. 1483).
 Wenceslaus III (d. 1479).
 Barbara (d. 1510), married in 1475 to Duke Jan IV of Oświęcim (d. 1495/1497).

In 1451 in Kraków, Nicholas V married his second wife. She was Barbara Rockemberg (d. 1464) from a patrician family in Kraków. They had two children:
Nicholas (died in infancy).
Machna (d. 1508), married in 1482 to Duke Casimir II of Zator.

Since her stepsons John IV and Wenceslaus II were minors when Nicholas V died in 1452, Barbara was regent of Racibórz, Krnov, Bruntál and Rybnik from 1452 until 1462. She was also Lady of Pless, which was probably her jointure.

Notes

References 
 Ludwig Petry and Josef Joachim Menzel (eds.): Geschichte Schlesiens, vol. 1: Von der Urzeit bis zum Jahre 1526. 5th revised edition, Thorbecke, Stuttgart, 1988, pp. 191, 201 ff, 205 and 218
 Hugo Weczerka (ed.): Handbuch der historischen Stätten — Schlesien, vol. 316 in the series Kröners Taschenausgabe, Kröner, Stuttgart 1977, p. 411 and 457 and genealogical tables on p. 600-601

External links 
 

1409 births
1452 deaths
Opavian Přemyslids
Silesian nobility
Medieval Bohemian nobility
15th-century Bohemian people